Tosapusia longirostris is a species of sea snail, a marine gastropod mollusk, in the family Costellariidae, the ribbed miters.

Description
The length of the shell attains 22.3 mm.

Distribution
This species occurs in the following locations:
 Philippines
 Solomon Islands

References

Costellariidae
Gastropods described in 2017